Donovan Reid (born 31 August 1963) is a male retired British sprinter.

Athletics career
Reid competed in the men's 100 metres at the 1984 Summer Olympics. He represented England in the 200 metres and 4 x 100 metres relay events, at the 1982 Commonwealth Games in Brisbane, Queensland, Australia.

References

1963 births
Living people
Athletes (track and field) at the 1984 Summer Olympics
English male sprinters
Olympic athletes of Great Britain
Athletes (track and field) at the 1982 Commonwealth Games
Commonwealth Games competitors for England
Athletes from London